Black Peter is the English name of the European game of Schwarzer Peter which originated in Germany where, along with Quartett, it is one of the most common children's card games. Old Maid is similar in concept to Black Peter and may have derived from it.

Name 
The name Black Peter may be derived from the robber, Johann Peter Petri, a contemporary and accomplice of Johannes Bückler, the notorious German highwayman known as Schinderhannes. Petri also went under the nickname of "Old Black Peter" (der alte Schwarzpeter) or just "Black Peter" (Schwarzer Peter) and is supposed to have invented the game while in prison after 1811. However, the origin of the game may be older.

Italian children play Asinello ("little donkey"). In Sweden the game is called Svarte Petter, in Finland Musta Pekka, in Denmark Sorteper and in the Netherlands Zwarte Piet. However, there it is the same name as Saint Nicholas' helper, a character similar to Knecht Ruprecht or Krampus in German-speaking regions.

It is known in Dutch as zwartepieten ("playing Black Pete") or pijkezotjagen ("Chasing the jack of spades"), in Polish as Piotruś ("Peter"), in Icelandic as Svarti Pétur ("Black Peter"), in Czech as Černý Petr ("Black Peter"), in Swedish as Svarte Petter ("Black Peter"), in Croatia as Crni Petar ("Black Peter") or Krampus, and in Greek as "mu(n)tzuris" (μου(ν)τζούρης, "smudged, smutted").

Origin 
The origin of Black Peter is unclear, although legend has it that it was invented in gaol by the notorious criminal, Black Peter, in 1811. Its rules are recorded as early as 1821 in Das Neue Königliche L'Hombre, considerably before those of the English game of Old Maid, a "newly invented game" whose earliest rules appeared in 1884, and the French game of Vieux Garçon ("Old Boy"), first recorded in 1853. It is probably much older and once a simple gambling game in which the aim was to determine a loser who had to pay for the next round of drinks (cf. drinking game).  The game employs a pack of 32 French cards, Black Peter being, in the earliest rules, the Jack of Spades, the other black Jack having been removed. The player who is last in and left holding Black Peter is the loser and may originally have had to pay for the next round.

Black Peter has long been a popular children's game and numerous proprietary packs have been produced aimed at the children's market. The earliest known of such bespoke cards appeared around 1840 in a trilingual format. Over the course of the years the images changed, reflecting the culture and social norms of the period. In older packs, the Black Peter was typically a blackface caricature of a black man; other packs use a variety of different images such as chimney sweeps, black crows or black cats.

Rules 

Special Black Peter packs usually consist of 31 or 37 cards: the 'Black Peter' and 15 or 18 pairs of cards. Instead of proprietary playing cards, a pack of traditional French cards may be used with a Joker as the Black Peter, or one card removed to make a particular pair incomplete.

Any number of players can participate in the game, but at least two. The cards are shuffled and fully dealt out to the players. If players find pairs in their hands, they must discard those cards immediately.

Now the card drawing begins: the youngest child, or the child holding the most cards, or the player to the left of the dealer, draws a card from the player to the left and adds it to the hand. If that player can form a pair with this new card, it must be discarded. Then it is the turn of the player on the left to play in the same way. In this way, the game continues until all pairs are discarded and one player is left with Black Peter as the only card. This player is Black Peter and receives the agreed penalty, such as a black dot on the forehead, nose or cheek.

Saying 
The German saying "jemandem den Schwarzen Peter zuschieben" ("to pass the Black Peter to someone") means to pass the buck, to blame or to dump something inconvenient such as an unwelcome problem or responsibility on another person.

Footnotes

References

Literature 
 
 
 
 
 
 Der schwarze Peter. Ein Räuber im Hunsrück und Odenwald. CD-ROM for PC and Mac, Probst 2005, .

External links 

Dedicated deck card games
French deck card games
German deck card games
German card games
Card games for children
Games of chance
Drinking games
Multi-player card games
Card passing games
Card games introduced in the 1920s